The 1927 Temple Owls football team was an American football team that represented Temple University as an independent during the 1927 college football season. In its third season under head coach Heinie Miller, the team compiled a 7–1 record. Fullback Harry J. Jacobs was the team captain.

Schedule

References

Temple
Temple Owls football seasons
Temple Owls football